Stanley Francis Gaines (February 12, 1891 – September 17, 1950) was an American politician who served as a Democratic member of the Mississippi House of Representatives, representing Bolivar County, from 1916 to 1920.

Biography 
Stanley Francis Gaines was born on February 12, 1891, in Bowling Green, Kentucky. His parents were Len H. Gaines and Mary Jannette (Francis) Gaines. He attended the University of Mississippi. He was a First Lieutenant of the Mississippi National Guard. He was the Alderman of Boyle, Mississippi, from 1913 to 1915. In 1915, he was elected to the Mississippi House of Representatives, representing Bolivar County, as a Democrat. He married Louise C. Coats in 1915. He died in Boyle, Mississippi in September 1950 at the age of 59.

References 

1891 births
1950 deaths
Democratic Party members of the Mississippi House of Representatives
People from Bolivar County, Mississippi
People from Bowling Green, Kentucky